The Raven is the nineteenth solo studio album by American rock musician Lou Reed, released on January 28, 2003 by Sire Records. It is a concept album, recounting the short stories and poems of Edgar Allan Poe through word and song, and was based on his 2000 opera co-written with Robert Wilson, POEtry.

The Raven features new and very different versions of two songs that Reed had released on earlier albums: "Perfect Day" (originally found on 1972's Transformer) and "The Bed" (from 1973's Berlin). In addition to Reed, the album features a number of guest vocalists including Laurie Anderson, David Bowie, Antony Hegarty, Steve Buscemi and Willem Dafoe. The co-producer of the album, Hal Willner, had previously overseen the Poe tribute album Closed on Account of Rabies.

The recording was simultaneously released as a two-disc set of recordings and in an edited single-disc version. Painter and filmmaker Julian Schnabel created the cover. The Raven would prove to be the final solo rock album by Reed, as 2007's Hudson River Wind Meditations consisted entirely of meditational new-age music, and 2011's Lulu was a collaborative rock album with heavy metal band Metallica.

Track listing
All tracks written by Lou Reed.

Limited edition double CD set

Disc 1: Act 1: The Play
"The Conqueror Worm"
"Overture"
"Old Poe"
"Prologue (Ligeia)"
"Edgar Allan Poe"
"The Valley of Unrest"
"Call on Me"
"The City in the Sea/Shadow"
"A Thousand Departed Friends"
"Change"
"The Fall of the House of Usher"
"The Bed"
"Perfect Day"
"The Raven"
"Balloon"

Disc 2: Act 2
 "Broadway Song"
 "The Tell-Tale Heart (Pt. 1)"
 "Blind Rage"
 "The Tell-Tale Heart (Pt. 2)"
 "Burning Embers"
 "Imp of the Perverse"
 "Vanishing Act"
 "The Cask"
 "Guilty", spoken
 "Guilty", sung
 "A Wild Being from Birth"
 "I Wanna Know (The Pit and the Pendulum)"
 "Science of the Mind"
 "Annabel Lee – The Bells"
 "Hop Frog"
 "Every Frog Has His Day"
 "Tripitena's Speech"
 "Who Am I? (Tripitena's Song)"
 "Courtly Orangutans"
 "Fire Music"
 "Guardian Angel"

1 CD edition

 "Overture"
 "Edgar Allan Poe"
 "Call on Me"
 "The Valley of Unrest"
 "A Thousand Departed Friends"
 "Change"
 "The Bed"
 "Perfect Day"
 "The Raven"
 "Balloon"
 "Broadway Song"
 "Blind Rage"
 "Burning Embers"
 "Vanishing Act"
 "Guilty"
 "I Wanna Know (The Pit and the Pendulum)"
 "Science of the Mind"
 "Hop Frog"
 "Tripitena's Speech"
 "Who Am I? (Tripitena's Song)"
 "Guardian Angel"

Personnel
Adapted from The Raven liner notes.

Musicians
 Lou Reed – vocals; guitar
 Mike Rathke – guitar
 Fernando Saunders – bass; guitar; backing vocals
 Tony "Thunder" Smith – drums
 Friedrich Paravicini – piano; keyboards
 Jane Scarpantoni – cello; string arrangement
 Doug Wieselman – baritone; tenor saxophone
 Paul Shapiro – tenor saxophone
 Steve Bernstein – trumpet; horn arrangement
 Art Baron – trombone on "Broadway Song"
 Ornette Coleman – alto saxophone on "Guilty"
 Frank Wulff – oboe; hurdy-gurdy on "Overture" and "The Fall of the House of Usher"
 Kate & Anna McGarrigle – vocals on "Balloon"
 Antoine Silverman – violin
 Marti Sweet – violin
 Patrick Carroll – bass; drum programming on "Who Am I? (Tripitena's Song)"
 Shelly Woodworth – English horn on "Who Am I? (Tripitena's Song)"
 Russ DeSalvo – guitar; keyboards on "Who Am I? (Tripitena's Song)"
 Rob Mathes – string arrangement on "Who Am I? (Tripitena's Song)"
 Laurie Anderson – vocals on "Call on Me"
 Antony Hegarty – vocals on "Perfect Day"; backing vocals
 David Bowie – vocals on "Hop Frog"
 The Blind Boys of Alabama – backing vocals on "I Wanna Know (The Pit and the Pendulum)"
 Willem Dafoe – voice on "The Conqueror Worm", "The Raven", "The Cask" and "Prologue (Ligeia)"
 Steve Buscemi – voice on "Broadway Song", "Old Poe" & "The Cask"
 Elizabeth Ashley – voice on "The Valley of Unrest"
 Amanda Plummer – voice on "Tripitena's Speech"

Production and artwork
 Lou Reed – producer; mixing; recording
 Hal Willner – producer 
 Ric Wake – production on "Who Am I? (Tripitena's Song)"
 Tim Latham – recording; mixing
 Aaron Franz – additional recording
 Jim Monti – additional recording
 Julian Schnabel – design; photography

References

Lou Reed albums
2003 albums
Sire Records albums
Albums produced by Lou Reed
Albums produced by Hal Willner
Music based on works by Edgar Allan Poe
Concept albums